Clackmannanshire was a county constituency of the House of Commons of Great Britain from 1708 until 1800, and of the House of Commons of the United Kingdom from 1801 to 1832.

The constituency
Clackmannanshire was Scotland's smallest county. The British parliamentary constituency was created in 1708 following the Acts of Union, 1707 and replaced the former Parliament of Scotland shire constituency of Clackmannanshire. Clackmannanshire was paired as an alternating constituency with neighbouring Kinross-shire. The freeholders of Clackmannanshire elected one Member of Parliament (MP)  to one Parliament, while those of Kinross-shire elected a Member to the next.

Abolition
The Representation of the People (Scotland) Act 1832 abolished the alternating constituencies. Clackmannanshire was merged with Kinross-shire into the single constituency of Clackmannanshire and Kinross-shire, electing one Member between them to each Parliament.

Members of Parliament

References

Historic parliamentary constituencies in Scotland (Westminster)
Constituencies of the Parliament of the United Kingdom established in 1708
Constituencies of the Parliament of the United Kingdom disestablished in 1832